Elias Maguri (born 29 August 1991) is a Tanzanian footballer who plays for F.C. Platinum. He formerly played for the Tanzania national football team.

International goals
Scores and results list Tanzania's goal tally first.

References

External links 
 
 

1991 births
Living people
Association football forwards
Tanzania international footballers
Tanzanian footballers
People from Musoma
Prisons F.C. players

Simba S.C. players

AS Kigali FC players
Kinondoni Municipal Council F.C. players

F.C. Platinum players
Tanzanian Premier League players